The New York class was a pair of super-dreadnought battleships built for the United States Navy between 1911 and 1914.

Designed as a more heavily armed improvement over the previous , the New York class was the first battleship to feature the /45 caliber gun and the first American super-dreadnought, but was one of the last battleship classes designed with a five-turret layout and coal for fuel. The class also suffered several deficiencies such as a lack of anti-aircraft weaponry and armor layout, which were addressed with the subsequent . Because of these deficiencies, both ships saw several extensive overhauls over the course of their careers which greatly changed their appearance.

Both New York and Texas entered service in 1914 and immediately served in the occupation of Veracruz, and service reinforcing the Royal Navy's Grand Fleet in the North Sea during World War I, during which time New York is believed to have sunk a U-boat in an accidental collision. Both ships undertook numerous training exercises and overhauls during the interwar era, and joined the Neutrality Patrol at the beginning of World War II. Outmoded by more advanced battleships in service, both ships served primarily as convoy escorts and naval artillery during the war. New York supported Operation Torch in North Africa, undertook convoy patrols and training in the Atlantic, and supported the Battle of Iwo Jima and the Battle of Okinawa. Texas supported Operation Torch, Operation Overlord, the bombardment of Cherbourg, Operation Dragoon and the battles at Iwo Jima and Okinawa. Following the war, New York was used as a target ship in Operation Crossroads and sunk as a target in 1948, while Texas was converted into a museum ship, and was moored in San Jacinto State Park till being moved to a drydock in Galveston, Texas in August 2022 for restoration operations.

Background
The New York class was the fifth of 11 separate classes planned by the United States Navy between 1906 and 1919, a total of 29 battleships and 6 battlecruisers. Virtually the entire American battle line was being designed from pre-dreadnought experience and observation of foreign designs. The design of the New York-class battleship originated in the 1908 Newport Conference, which resulted in a new method for battleship design, with the General Board taking a more active role in the design process of ships, and the navy's Board on Construction would implement the design instead of creating it. While the New York class was mostly designed by the Board on Construction, lessons learned on the class allowed the General Board to take the lead on the following s.

There was debate at the time as to whether the s, laid down in 1909, should carry heavier armament than the /45 caliber Mark 5 gun. Ultimately, on 30 March 1909, US Congress approved the construction of two "Design 601" battleships, also known as Battleship 1910 with six 12-inch turrets, which the General Board had selected over two 14-inch designs in 1909. At the same time, the General Board began planning for the next class of ships, and on 21 April 1909 decided on two battleships with similar sizes, and after some debate about main guns approval of two battleships was granted on 24 June 1910. In 1911 the US Senate's Naval Affairs Committee suggested reducing the size of the ships as part of a $24,000,000 budget reduction, but Secretary of the Navy George von Lengerke Meyer fought to keep the original design and the ships were not altered.

The class is generally referred to as the New York class, but it is also occasionally called the Texas class because New York was completed several months after her sister, Texas.

Design

General characteristics 
The ships underwent significant changes and increases in armor and armament over their operational lives. Following her fourth and final refit in 1943, New York increased her displacement to  standard and  full-load. As designed, the ships had a crew complement consisting of 1,042 officers and enlisted men. By 1945, Texas was carrying 1,723 officers and enlisted men with the addition of crews for additional weapons as well as a new complement of Marines.

Armament 

The main battery of the class consisted of ten 14-inch/45 caliber guns, arrayed in five 2-gun turrets designated 1, 2, 3, 4, and 5, and able to elevate to 15 degrees. The class was the last to feature a turret mounted amidships. In 1910 the US Navy's Bureau of Ordnance had successfully designed and tested its 14-inch naval gun. The gun proved to have remarkable accuracy and uniformity of pattern. By 1910 no US dreadnought type battleship had yet hit the water, as all were either at some stage of building or in design. Virtually the entire US Navy battle line was being designed by drawing on experience from pre-dreadnought designs or from observation of foreign battleship designs.

As built, both ships also carried 21 /51 caliber guns arrayed ten to a side with one in the stern, primarily for defense against destroyers and torpedo boats. Many of the 5-inch guns were poor in accuracy in rough seas due to being mounted near the ends of the ship and below the main deck. The ships were not designed with anti-aircraft (AA) defense in mind, and with the development of naval aviation, this was seen as a serious drawback to the class. The New York class was the first US battleship to mount anti-aircraft guns, with two /50 caliber guns mounted on platforms on top of the boat cranes of Texas in 1916. In 1918, the secondary armament was reduced to 16 5-inch/51 caliber guns, eight to a side, as the guns near the ends of the ship were difficult to work in any kind of sea. When both ships were refitted 1925–26, AA defense was increased with eight 3-inch/50 caliber guns arrayed four to a side. Six of the sixteen remaining 5-inch guns were relocated higher in the ship to new casemates on the main deck. The New York class also initially featured four torpedo tubes, 1 each on the port side bow and stern and starboard bow and stern, for the Bliss-Leavitt Mark 3 torpedo, instead of the previous two, because of advances in torpedo performance increasing the prominence of the weapon. The torpedo rooms held 12 torpedoes total, plus 12 naval defense mines. However, the torpedo tubes were removed in the 1925-26 refit.

Magazine and machinery spaces were enclosed in the protected hull. Magazine volume was reduced for increased machinery, with each magazine accommodating 75 to 80 shells and charges, while more shells were carried in their turrets and handling rooms.

In 1937 eight /75 caliber AA guns in two quadruple mounts were added to improve the light AA armament. The ships were more extensively refitted with large amounts of light AA guns at the expense of the 5-inch/51 caliber guns in 1942, as the attack on Pearl Harbor had shown pre-war light AA armament to be inadequate. The 1.1 inch quad mounts were removed and 24 Bofors 40 mm guns were added in six quadruple mounts (later increased to 40 guns), while 42 Oerlikon 20 mm guns in single mounts were also added. The 3-inch AA gun armament was increased to 10 guns, while the 5-inch gun armament was reduced to 6 guns.

Armor
The ships continued the armor suite of the Wyoming class with minor improvements. The deck armor scheme would continue to remain distinctly inferior to the succeeding Nevada class with their all or nothing armor scheme. However the leap forward in range provided by improved fire control was not yet envisioned and had it been there would not have been time to include it within the current design. The New York class was the first to incorporate an armored central plotting room below decks, but atop the protective deck, and enclosed in a thin box of splinter armor.

Armor on the New York class consisted of belt armor from 10 to 12 inches thick. Armor on her barbettes was between 10 and 12 inches. Conning towers were protected by 12 inches of armor, with 4 inches of armor on the tops.

Propulsion 
However, it was discovered that greater propulsive efficiency of the reciprocating engine allowed a reduction in installed power, needing only 28,100 shp to make 21 knots.

The New York class was the final class of US battleship to be powered by coal. The class was designed to carry  of coal, the most of any battleship class. In 1910, the succeeding battleships of the Nevada class were designed with fuel oil in mind. Six new Bureau Express oil-fired boilers replaced the fourteen older design coal-fired boilers at that time with no loss of power.

Construction 

Funding for the battleships was authorized by a 24 June 1910 act, which called for the ships to cost no more than $6,000,000. The act also specified new labor policies for their construction which put strict limits on labor hours and working conditions for shipyard employees. Bids were solicited only for Battleship No. 35, Texas, on 27 September 1910, while Battleship No. 34, New York, was to be built by New York Navy Yard. Bids opened for No. 35 on 1 December. Ultimately Newport News Shipbuilding Company won the contract with a bid of $5,830,000. Battleship No. 35 began construction first, on 17 April 1911, launched 18 May 1912, and completed on 12 March 1914. Battleship No. 34 was laid down on 11 September 1911, launched on 30 October 1912, and completed on 15 April 1914.

By 1926, the New York class was considered obsolete compared with other battleships in service, so both ships received a complete refit. An additional  were added for defense against aerial targets and submarines. Her fourteen coal-fired boilers were replaced by six Bureau Express oil-fired boilers and the twin funnels were trunked into one, aft of the forward superstructure. Tripods were fitted in place of the lattice masts, and atop the forward tripod a control tower was installed. A tower was built amidships that contained additional fire control to backup the system on the foremast. A new aircraft catapult was installed atop turret Number 3, and cranes were installed on either side of the funnel for boat and aircraft handling. Additional deck protection was added, and each ship's beam was widened. The ships were fitted with anti-torpedo bulges, though these made maneuvering harder at low speeds and both rolled badly, and gunfire accuracy was reduced in rough seas.

Service history

USS New York

Shortly after commissioning, New York became flagship for the United States occupation of Veracruz in 1914. During World War I, she became flagship of Battleship Division 9, commanded by Rear Admiral Hugh Rodman. Sent to reinforce the British Grand Fleet in the North Sea, she conducted blockade and escort duties. She twice came into contact with German U-boats, and is believed to have accidentally sunk one. She returned to the United States at the end of the war, and began taking on patrol and training duties. New York was fitted with XAF RADAR in February 1938, including the first United States duplexer so a single antenna could both send and receive.

She was a part of the Neutrality Patrol following the outbreak of World War II in September 1939, and spent the beginning of the war escorting convoys between New York and Iceland. She saw action supporting Operation Torch, the Allied invasion of North Africa, where she targeted shore batteries threatening the landings in November 1942. She remained in convoy patrol and training for several years, until she was moved to the Pacific Fleet late in the war and supported landings on Iwo Jima in February 1945, and later the invasion of Okinawa in April 1945. She was lightly damaged by a kamikaze attack in this battle. Following the war, she was used as a target ship during the two atomic bomb tests of Operation Crossroads, and was subsequently studied for its effects, before being sunk as a target off Hawaii in 1948.

USS Texas

Texas also participated in the occupation of Veracruz for several months in 1914, before conducting training and upgrades to become the first ship of the US Navy to mount anti-aircraft weapons. She conducted convoy patrols early in World War I and was the first US ship to fire on a German one during a convoy mission in 1917. She joined other US battleships in reinforcing the British fleet near the end of the war and was present for the German surrender. In the inter-war period she became one of the first battleships to launch and operate aircraft, and frequently alternated her time between the Atlantic and Pacific waters on training exercises.

She was part of the Neutrality Patrol at the beginning of World War II and supported Allied landings at North Africa, and then conducted convoy patrol duty to North African and European ports throughout 1943. On 6 June 1944, she supported Operation Overlord, covering Allied landings on the beaches of Normandy, France, in particular the battle at Pointe du Hoc. Later that month on 25 June, she supported the bombardment of Cherbourg and there was damaged when she was hit with a German artillery shell. In July she moved to support Operation Dragoon, the Allied invasion of southern France. Following extensive repairs and training, she moved to the Pacific and supported the invasion of Iwo Jima in February 1945. She then moved to support landings on Okinawa in April. Following the end of the war, Texas was decommissioned, and in 1948 she was moved to San Jacinto State Park and converted into a museum ship, where she remained till August 31, 2022. She was floated to a drydock in Galveston, Texas for $35,000,000 restoration project estimated to last for 12–18 months. Her new home in Texas is still undetermined as of the date of the move.

Ships in class

References

Citations

Sources

External links 

 New York class (BB-34 and BB-35): Online Library of Selected Images (US Navy)
 
 

 

Battleship classes
 
World War I battleships of the United States